Mitchell was a Legislative Assembly electorate in the state of Queensland, Australia.

History

The electoral district of Mitchell was created by the Additional Members Act of 1864 which introduced six new single-member electorates. A by-election was held to fill the seat. The nomination date was 18 March 1865 and the election was held on 25 March 1865.

In 1885, part of Mitchell was removed to form the new Electoral district of Barcoo.

In 1931, a redistribution absorbed Mitchell into the Electoral district of Barcoo and the Electoral district of Gregory.

Members

The following people were elected in Mitchell:

See also
 Electoral districts of Queensland
 Members of the Queensland Legislative Assembly by year
 :Category:Members of the Queensland Legislative Assembly by name

References

Former electoral districts of Queensland
1865 establishments in Australia
1932 establishments in Australia
Constituencies established in 1865
Constituencies disestablished in 1932